Software in the Public Interest, Inc. (SPI) is a US 501(c)(3) non-profit organization domiciled in New York State formed to help other organizations create and distribute free open-source software and open-source hardware. Anyone is eligible to apply for membership, and contributing membership is available to those who participate in the free software community.

SPI was originally created to allow the Debian Project to accept donations. It now acts as a fiscal sponsor to many free and open source projects.

SPI has hosted Wikimedia Foundation board elections and audited the tally as a neutral third party from 2007 to 2011.

Associated projects
The 40 currently associated projects of SPI are:

 0 A.D.
 Adélie Linux
 ankur.org.in
 aptosid
 Arch Linux
 Arch Linux 32
 ArduPilot
 Battle for Wesnoth
 Debian
 FFmpeg
 Fluxbox
 Gallery
 Ganeti
 GNUstep
 GNU TeXmacs
 haskell.org
 LibreOffice
 MinGW
 MPI Forum
 NTPsec
 ns-3
 OFTC
 Open Bioinformatics Foundation
 Open MPI
 Open Voting Foundation
 OpenEmbedded
 OpenSAF
 OpenVAS
 OpenZFS
 PMIx
 PostgreSQL
 Privoxy
 SproutCore
 Swathanthra Malayalam Computing
 systemd
 The Mana World
 translatewiki.net
 Tux4Kids
 X.Org
 YafaRay

Board of directors

Its current board is composed of:

 President: Michael Schultheiss
 Vice-President: Stephen Frost
 Secretary: Forrest Fleming
 Treasurer: Héctor Orón Martínez
 Board of Directors:
 Joseph Conway
 Milan Kupcevic
 Jonatas L. Nogueira
 Jeremy Stanley
 Zach van Rijn

See also 

 List of free and open-source software organizations

References

External links
 

501(c)(3) organizations
Debian
Free and open-source software organizations
Organizations established in 1997
1997 establishments in New York (state)